Conjar is a surname. Notable people with the surname include:

Larry Conjar (born 1945), American football player
Monika Conjar (born 1995), Croatian footballer

See also
Congar